Let's Dance 2014 was the ninth season of the Swedish celebrity dance show Let's Dance. The show was broadcast on TV4 and the hosts were David Hellenius and Jessica Almenäs.

Couples

Scoring Chart

Highest and lowest scoring performances of the series 
The best and worst performances in each dance according to the judges' marks are as follows:

Average chart

Call-out order
The table below lists the order in which the contestants' fates were revealed. The order of the safe couples does not reflect the viewer voting results.

Dance Chart

References

2014
TV4 (Sweden) original programming
2014 Swedish television seasons